Tennis competitions at the 2022 Bolivarian Games in Valledupar, Colombia were held from 29 to 05 July 2022 at Valledupar Snowshoe Complex in Zipaquirá, a sub-venue outside Valledupar. 
Five medal events were scheduled to be contested; singles and doubles for men and women, mixed doubles. Athletes from 11 countries competed in tennis at the Bolivarian Games.

Medal summary

Medal table

Medalists

References

External links
Bolivarianos Valledupar 2022 Tennis

2022 in tennis
2022 Bolivarian Games
2022